Nordholt is a surname. Notable people with the surname include:

Beth Nordholt, American physicist
Henk Schulte Nordholt (born 1953), Dutch historian of Indonesia
Henk Schulte Nordholt (1909–1998), Dutch historian of art